The European Olympic Committees is an organisation based in Rome, Italy, consisting of 50 National Olympic Committees from the continent of Europe. Among other duties, the EOC organizes three major multi-sport events. These are the European Youth Olympic Festival, the Games of the Small States of Europe and the European Games.

The EOC has no connection with another multi-sport event called the European Championships, which are organised by various European discipline-specific sports associations.

Member nations 
In the following table, the year in which the NOC was recognised by the International Olympic Committee (IOC) is also given if it is different from the year in which the NOC was created.

Former members

Events
 European Games
 European Youth Olympic Festival (EYOF)
 Games of the Small States of Europe

See also
 European Paralympic Committee

Notes

External links
 Official EOC website

Europe
European sports federations
Olympic Committees
European Games
Organisations based in Rome
Olympic organizations
Sports organizations established in 1968
1968 establishments in Europe